NGC 1271 is a compact elliptical or lenticular galaxy located about 250 million light-years away in the constellation Perseus. The galaxy was discovered by astronomer Guillaume Bigourdan on November 14, 1884. NGC 1271 is a member of the Perseus Cluster and has a nuclear dust disk in its center.  It also has an edge-on, intermediate-scale disk and has a central bulge. Like NGC 1277, NGC 1271 is a candidate "relic galaxy".

Supermassive black hole

See also
 List of NGC objects (1001–2000)
 NGC 1277

References

External links

Perseus Cluster
Perseus (constellation)
Elliptical galaxies
Lenticular galaxies
1271
12367 
Astronomical objects discovered in 1884
Discoveries by Guillaume Bigourdan